Treforest Estate railway station (also Trefforest Estate,) is a small railway station in Treforest, near Cardiff, built to serve the workers and visitors of Treforest Industrial Estate.

Passenger services are provided by Transport for Wales. The station is built around a central island platform, which is accessible from a subway.

History
It was opened by the Great Western Railway in 1942.

In the spring of 2016 new shelters were installed on the platform ahead of the South Wales Metro project.

Future

The station is to be relocated by December 2025 as part of the South Wales Metro and has been included in the Wales & Borders franchise. This is to improve safety and convenience.

Services 
There is a half-hourly service northbound to  via . There is no Sunday service.

References

External links 

Railway stations in Rhondda Cynon Taf
DfT Category F2 stations
Former Great Western Railway stations
Railway stations in Great Britain opened in 1942
Railway stations served by Transport for Wales Rail
1942 establishments in Wales